is a Japanese female mixed martial artist, judoka and submission grappler. She is the former Rizin Super Atomweight Champion. She has fought in MMA promotions Shooto, Jewels and Rizin in Japan, and Invicta FC in the United States. Hamasaki won the first Jewels  Queen tournament to become the first lightweight champion of the promotion. She is a former Invicta FC Atomweight Champion. Hamasaki is the first Asian to win a North American premier MMA promotion title.

Fight Matrix and MMARising.com list her as the number 2 atomweight fighter in the world, and one of the top 10 pound for pound female fighters in the world.

Personal life

Outside of fighting, Hamasaki enjoys time with her dogs and going for walks.

Martial arts training
Hamasaki practiced judo for 8 years, achieving 2nd dan. She stopped practicing judo after finishing college and was working in an office. A year and a half later, Hamasaki began training in MMA around 2008, partly for dieting purposes. She was introduced to the Abe Ani Combat Club (AACC) by her friend and AACC member Rina Tomita, and although Hamasaki knew about MMA, she was unaware of women's MMA.

Mixed martial arts career

Deep Jewels

In the same event, Hamasaki defeated South Korean Seo Hee Ham by unanimous decision, surprising commentators by holding her own in the striking exchanges against the experienced Korean kickboxer. Hamasaki won the tournament in the process and became the first Jewels Lightweight (115 lbs) Queen Champion.

However, Ellis suffered a calf injury and was forced to withdraw from the fight. Hamasaki was then set to face Jessica Aguilar at 12th Ring instead, but the event was cancelled after the Tōhoku earthquake and tsunami earlier in the day.

She defeated Inoue by unanimous decision.

She won the fight by TKO (corner stoppage) after the first round when Ham could not continue due to injury.

She won the fight by submission due to a kimura in the first round.

Invicta FC
However, Cive was unable to secure a visa to compete and Hamasaki faced Lacey Schuckman instead. She defeated Schuckman by submission due to an armbar late in the third round.

Hamasaki was expected to face Carla Esparza at Invicta FC 4 in January 2013. However, Hamasaki withdrew from the fight in order to defend her Jewels title.

Hamasaki was then matched up against Cláudia Gadelha. She was defeated by TKO in the third round.

Invicta FC Atomweight Champion
After suffering her first professional defeat, Hamasaki bounced back with two victories in Deep Jewels before challenging Hérica Tibúrcio at Invicta FC 13: Cyborg vs. Van Duin for the Invicta FC Atomweight Championship. Hamasaki won the fight and championship via split decision.

Hamasaki made her first title defense against Amber Brown at Invicta FC 16: Hamasaki vs. Brown on March 11, 2016. She successfully defended the title via third-round submission.

Her second title defense took place against Jinh Yu Frey at Invicta FC 19: Maia vs. Modafferi on September 23, 2016. She won the fight and retained the title via second-round doctor stoppage.

She then faced Lívia Renata Souza in a strawweight bout at Invicta FC 22: Evinger vs. Kunitskaya II on March 25, 2017. She lost the fight via first-round knockout.

Later in 2017 Hamasaki vacated her Invicta FC Atomweight title and subsequently signed with Rizin Fighting Federation.

Rizin FF

First Super Atomweight title reign
Ayaka faced Kanna Asakura on December 21, 2018 at Rizin 14 for the Rizin Super Atomweight Championship. She won the bout and the championship in the second rout via armbar. 

Ayaka defended her title for the first time against Invicta FC Atomweight Champion Jinh Yu Frey at Rizin 16: Kobe on June 2, 2019. Ayaka won the fight via unanimous decision.

Ayaka faced Suwanan Boonsorn in a non-title bout on August 18, 2019 at RIZIN 18. She won the bout easily via first round armbar. 

Ayaka faced former Road FC Women's Atomweight Champion Seo Hee Ham at Rizin 20 on December 31, 2019. She lost the trilogy fight via split decision, losing the Rizin Women's Super Atomweight Champion in the process.

On August 9, 2020, she faced Tomo Maesawa at Rizin 22 and won via second round kimura.

Second Super Atomweight title reign
Hamasaki next faced three time freestyle wrestling World Champion Miyuu Yamamoto on December 31, 2020 for the vacant RIZIN Super Atomweight belt. Ahead of her fight against Miyuu Yamamoto at RIZIN 26, Hamasaki said the opportunity to fight someone as legendary in combat sports like Yamamoto was an honor. Hamasaki won the bout and reclaimed the championship via first-round submission.

Hamasaki made her first title defense in a rematch against Kanna Asakura at Rizin 27 on March 21, 2021. She won a close bout via split decision. 

Hamasaki was scheduled to face Emi Fujino in a non-title bout on September 19, 2021 at Rizin 30. She won the fight by unanimous decision.

Hamasaki faced the reigning Jewels Strawweight champion Seika Izawa in a non-title bout at Rizin 33 - Saitama on December 31, 2021. She suffered her first loss in two years, as Izawa won the bout by a second-round technical knockout.

Hamasaki made her second Super Atomweight title defense against Seika Izawa at Rizin 35 on April 16, 2022. She lost the fight by unanimous decision.

Super Atomweight Grand Prix
On July 7, 2022, it was revealed that Hamasaki would be one of eight participants in the 2022 Rizin Super Atomweight Grand Prix. Hamasaki faced the inaugural WSOF Women's Strawweight champion Jessica Aguilar in the tournament quarterfinals which were held at Rizin 37 - Saitama on July 31, 2022. She won the fight by unanimous decision.

Hamasaki was booked to face Si Woo Park in the tournament semifinals at Rizin 38 on September 25, 2022. She lost the fight by unanimous decision.

Submission grappling

She won the match by split decision.

Championships and accomplishments
Rizin Fighting Federation
 Rizin Super Atomweight Championship (Inaugural, 2 times)
Two successful title defenses
Invicta Fighting Championships
Invicta FC Atomweight Champion (One time; vacated title)
Two successful title defenses
Deep Jewels
 Jewels Lightweight Queen tournament winner
 Jewels Lightweight Queen Champion (former; vacated title)
Three successful title defenses
Women's MMA Awards
 2014 Atomweight of the Year

Mixed martial arts record

|-
|Loss
|align=center|24–6
|Si Woo Park
|Decision (unanimous)
|Rizin 38
|
|align=center|3
|align=center|5:00
|Saitama, Japan
|
|-
|Win
|align=center|24–5
|Jessica Aguilar
|Decision (unanimous)
|Rizin 37
|
|align=center|3
|align=center|5:00
|Saitama, Japan
|
|-
|Loss
|align=center|23–5
|Seika Izawa
|Decision (unanimous)
|Rizin 35
|
|align=center|3
|align=center|5:00
|Chōfu, Japan
| 
|-
|Loss
|align=center|23–4
|Seika Izawa
|TKO (elbows and punches)
|Rizin 33
|
|align=center|2
|align=center|2:50
|Saitama, Japan
|
|-
|Win
|align=center|23–3
|Emi Fujino
|Decision (unanimous)
|Rizin 30
|
|align=center|3
|align=center|5:00
|Saitama, Japan
|
|-
|Win
|align=center|22–3
|Kanna Asakura
|Decision (split)
|Rizin 27
|
|align=center|3
|align=center|5:00
|Nagoya, Japan
|
|-
|Win
|align=center|21–3
|Miyuu Yamamoto
|Submission (leg scissor choke)
|Rizin 26
|
|align=center|1
|align=center|1:42
|Saitama, Japan
|
|-
|Win
|align=center|20–3
|Tomo Maesawa
|Submission (kimura)
|Rizin 22
|
|align=center|2
|align=center|1:26
|Yokohama, Japan
|
|-
|Loss
|align=center|19–3
|Seo Hee Ham
|Decision (split)
|Rizin 20
|
|align=center|3
|align=center|5:00
|Saitama, Japan
|
|-
|Win
|align=center|19–2
|Suwanan Boonsorn
|Submission (armbar)
|Rizin 18
|
|align=center|1
|align=center|3:20
|Nagoya, Japan
|
|-
|Win
| align=center| 18–2
|Jinh Yu Frey
|Decision (unanimous)
|Rizin 16
|
| style="text-align:center;"| 3
| style="text-align:center;"| 5:00
|Kobe, Japan
|
|-
|Win
| align=center| 17–2
|Kanna Asakura
|Submission (armbar)
|Rizin 14
|
|align=center|2
|align=center|4:34
|Saitama, Japan
|
|-
|Win
| align=center| 16–2
|Mina Kurobe
|Submission (kimura)
|Rizin 13
|
|align=center|1
|align=center|4:45
|Saitama, Japan
|
|-
|Win
| align=center| 15–2
|Alyssa Garcia
|Decision (unanimous)
|Rizin 10
|
|align=center|3
|align=center|5:00
|Fukuoka, Japan
|
|-
|Loss
| align=center| 14–2
|Lívia Renata Souza
|KO (punches)
|Invicta FC 22: Evinger vs. Kunitskaya II
|
| style="text-align:center;"| 1
| style="text-align:center;"| 1:41
|Kansas City, Missouri, United States
|
|-
|Win
| align=center| 14–1
|Jinh Yu Frey
|TKO (doctor stoppage)
|Invicta FC 19: Maia vs. Modafferi
|
| style="text-align:center;"| 2
| style="text-align:center;"| 4:38
|Kansas City, Missouri, United States
|
|-
|Win
| align=center| 13–1
|Amber Brown
|Submission (armbar)
|Invicta FC 16: Hamasaki vs. Brown
|
| style="text-align:center;"| 3
| style="text-align:center;"| 2:52
|Las Vegas, Nevada, United States
|
|-
|Win
| align=center| 12–1
|Hérica Tibúrcio
|Decision (split)
|Invicta FC 13: Cyborg vs. Van Duin
|
| style="text-align:center;"| 5
| style="text-align:center;"| 5:00
|Las Vegas, Nevada, United States
|
|-
| Win
| align=center| 11–1
| Mei Yamaguchi
| Decision (unanimous)
| Deep - Dream Impact 2014: Omisoka Special 
| 
| align=center| 2
| align=center| 5:00
| Saitama, Japan
| 
|-
| Win
| align=center| 10–1
| Naho Sugiyama
| TKO (Punches)
| Deep Jewels 5: Inoue vs Tomimatsu
| 
| align=center| 1
| align=center| 4:01
| Tokyo, Japan
| 
|-
| Loss
| align=center| 9–1
| Cláudia Gadelha
| TKO (punches)
| Invicta FC 6: Coenen vs. Cyborg
| 
| align=center| 3 
| align=center| 3:58
| Kansas City, Missouri, United States
|  
|-
| Win
| align=center| 9–0
| Emi Fujino
| Decision (unanimous)
| Jewels 22nd Ring
| 
| align=center| 3
| align=center| 5:00
| Tokyo, Japan
| 
|-
| Win
| align=center| 8–0
| Lacey Schuckman
| Submission (armbar)
| Invicta FC 2: Baszler vs. McMann
| 
| align=center| 3
| align=center| 4:45
| Kansas City, Kansas, United States
| 
|-
| Win
| align=center| 7–0
| Yuka Tsuji
| Submission (kimura)
| Jewels 19th Ring
| 
| align=center| 1
| align=center| 3:41
| Osaka, Japan
| 
|-
| Win
| align=center| 6–0
| Seo Hee Ham
| TKO (corner stoppage)
| Jewels 17th Ring
| 
| align=center| 1
| align=center| 5:00
| Tokyo, Japan
| 
|-
| Win
| align=center| 5–0
| Mizuki Inoue
| Decision (unanimous)
| Jewels 16th Ring
| 
| align=center| 2
| align=center| 5:00
| Tokyo, Japan
| 
|-
| Win
| align=center| 4–0
| Seo Hee Ham
| Decision (unanimous)
| Jewels 11th Ring
| 
| align=center| 2
| align=center| 5:00
| Tokyo, Japan
| 
|-
| Win
| align=center| 3–0
| Sakura Nomura
| Decision (unanimous)
| Jewels 11th Ring
| 
| align=center| 2
| align=center| 5:00
| Tokyo, Japan
| 
|-
| Win
| align=center| 2–0
| Han Sol Lee
| Submission (Americana)
| Jewels 9th Ring
| 
| align=center| 1
| align=center| 0:48
| Tokyo, Japan
| 
|-
| Win
| align=center| 1–0
| Kinuka Sasaki
| Submission (armbar)
| Shooto: Gig Central 19
| 
| align=center| 2
| align=center| 2:00
| Nagoya, Japan
|

See also
List of current Rizin FF fighters
 List of current mixed martial arts champions
 List of female mixed martial artists

References

External links
 
 Ayaka Hamasaki at Invicta FC
 Ayaka Hamasaki Awakening Profile
  
 Official blog 

1982 births
Japanese female judoka
Japanese female mixed martial artists
Living people
People from Yamaguchi Prefecture
Atomweight mixed martial artists
Strawweight mixed martial artists
Mixed martial artists utilizing judo